Semir may refer to:
 Semir (given name), an alternate form of the Arabic given name Samir
 Vladimir de Semir (born 1948), a Spanish journalist
 Semir (company), a Chinese clothing company